Thum is a surname. Notable people with the surname include:

Christian Thum (d. 1655), German-born Swedish actor and theater director
Denny Thum (born 1952), American football executive
Gregor Thum (born 1967), German historian
Joe Thum (fl. 1880s–1910s), American bowler
Jon Thum (fl. 1990s–2010s), visual effects artist
Patty Prather Thum (1853–1926), American artist 
Peter Thum, American entrepreneur and businessman
Robert Thum (fl. 1920s–1930s), Austrian table tennis player
Steffen Thum (born 1988), German composer
Thum Ping Tjin (born 1979), also known as PJ Thum, is a Singaporean historian and journalist
William Thum (1861–1941), Mayor of Pasadena, California

See also
Thum (disambiguation)